Cristilabrum rectum is a species of air-breathing land snail, a terrestrial pulmonate gastropod mollusk in the family Camaenidae. This species is endemic to Australia.

References 

Gastropods of Australia
rectum
Vulnerable fauna of Australia
Gastropods described in 1988
Taxonomy articles created by Polbot